Junious "Buck" Buchanan (September 10, 1940 – July 16, 1992) was an American professional football player who was a defensive tackle with the Kansas City Chiefs in the American Football League (AFL) and in the National Football League (NFL). Buchanan was inducted into the College Football Hall of Fame in 1996 and the Pro Football Hall of Fame in 1990. Buchanan was massive for his era, standing at 6'7", and weighing 270 lbs. His height gave him a big advantage against lineman in the trenches.

High school years
Buchanan attended  A. H. Parker High School in Birmingham, Alabama, and was a standout in football and basketball.

College years
Buchanan attended Grambling College in Louisiana and was a letterman in football and an NAIA All-America selection.  He was inducted into the College Football Hall of Fame in 1996. He is one of four Grambling State players, Willie Brown, Willie Davis, and Charlie Joiner coached by Eddie Robinson enshrined in the Pro Football Hall of Fame.

Professional career
The   Buchanan was selected in both the NFL and AFL drafts in 1963.  The New York Giants took him 265th overall in the 19th round of the 1963 NFL Draft, while he was the first overall selection in the AFL Draft by the Kansas City Chiefs. Eddie Robinson, his coach at Grambling State, where he had been an NAIA All-American in 1962, called him "the finest lineman I have seen."  Buchanan was the first black number one draft choice in Professional Football.  

Others who had watched Buchanan in action were equally enthusiastic. Buchanan had the physical size and athletic instincts to be exceptionally successful. He was particularly effective at intimidating the passer and in 1967 batted down 16 passes at or behind the line of scrimmage. He was clocked at 4.9 in the 40-yard dash and 10.2 in the 100-yard dash at Grambling State, allowing him to range from sideline to sideline to make tackles.

In spite of the weekly pounding he took on the line of scrimmage, Buchanan was extremely durable. He played in 182 career games that included a string of 166 straight. After dabbling briefly at defensive end as a rookie, Buchanan settled down to his permanent job as the Chiefs' defensive right tackle. He was named to his first AFL All-Star Game after his second season and played in six AFL All-Star games and two AFC-NFC Pro Bowls.

He teamed with Curley Culp, Aaron Brown and Jerry Mays to establish a dominant front four for the Chiefs, culminating in their victory over the Minnesota Vikings in Super Bowl IV, when they allowed Viking runners only 67 yards rushing in 19 carries and 172 net passing yards, Buchanan in particular dominating the opposing center, Mick Tingelhoff, a 5-time AP first-team All-Pro selection up to that 1969 season, as handily as the left guard, Jim Vellone.

He was selected to the second-team of the AFL All-Time Team, and was inducted into the Alabama Sports Hall of Fame in 1987 and the Pro Football Hall of Fame in 1990. Two years later, he died from lung cancer at the age of 51.

In 1999, he was ranked number 67 on The Sporting News' list of the 100 Greatest Football Players, right behind his former Chiefs teammate Bobby Bell. The Chiefs also retired his uniform number 86.

Personal life
Buchanan was diagnosed with lung cancer a week before his Hall of Fame induction and died at age 51 in his Kansas City home on July 16, 1992.

See also
 Buck Buchanan Award
 List of American Football League players

References

External links
 
 

1940 births
1992 deaths
People from Sumter County, Alabama
Players of American football from Alabama
American football defensive tackles
Grambling State Tigers football players
American Football League first overall draft picks
Kansas City Chiefs players
American Football League players
American Football League All-Star players
American Conference Pro Bowl players
American Football League All-Time Team
National Football League players with retired numbers
Pro Football Hall of Fame inductees
College Football Hall of Fame inductees
Deaths from lung cancer in Missouri